Narara is a suburb just north of Gosford on the Central Coast region of New South Wales, Australia. It is part of the  local government area.

The suburb is mostly residential but also holds Narara railway station on the Central Coast & Newcastle Line. It also contains a corner shop and bottleshop, a number of parks, sporting grounds, and a concrete public skatepark. It is the home of Narara Valley High School, a NSW government public high school, and St Philips Christian College Gosford, a private school educating children from kindergarten to year twelve.

It is also home to the Narara Ecovillage, which aims to research, design and build a stylish, intergenerational, friendly demonstration Ecovillage, blending the principles of ecological and social sustainability, good health, business, caring and other options that can evolve from our well-being. Narara also hosts the annual Ecoburbia festival, awarded Best Community Event by Gosford City Council in 2015.

The name 'Narara' can be traced back to the local Aboriginal term for 'black snake', which appears on the official emblem of Narara Valley High School and the scarf of 1st Narara Scout Group.

Narara's claim to fame is that the Narara Music Festival was held nearby in Somersby in 1983 and 1984.  The Angels, an Australian rock band, produced an 11 track live album recorded at the festival named, appropriately enough, "Live at Narara".

Narara largely consisted of orchards and small mixed farms. Water from the small dams that used to be accessible from Narara Creek Road was piped in wooden piping across Narara Creek to the Railway station to supply steam trains. The dams were also a popular swimming spot especially when the ladder and walkway still existed on the lower dam wall.

History
Narara is situated in the traditional lands of the Darkinjung people, whose name of the area means black snake.

On 15 August 1887, Narara railway station was opened. Two years later, with the opening of the Hawkesbury River Railway Bridge, the Main North railway line went through Narara.

References

External links
 Narara Valley High School website
 St Philips Christian College Gosford website
 Narara Ecovillage
 Narara Eco Living Network

Suburbs of the Central Coast (New South Wales)